Bride Wannabes is a popular 2012 Hong Kong television series that features five women in their 30s.  It was viewed by 1.7 million, almost 25% of the Hong Kong population. The show was criticized by some as more "an advertising package than a reality show" and reported to have "23 commercial operators in the first five shows, including dating companies, beauty salons and restaurants".

References 

Hong Kong television series
2010s Hong Kong television series
2012 Hong Kong television series debuts